The National Library of Finland is the foremost research library in Finland. Administratively the library is part of the University of Helsinki. From 1919 to 1 August 2006, it was known as the Helsinki University Library.

The National Library is responsible for storing the Finnish cultural heritage. By Finnish law, the National Library is a legal deposit library and receives copies of all printed matter, as well as audiovisual materials excepting films, produced in Finland or for distribution in Finland. These copies are then distributed by the Library to its own national collection and to reserve collections of five other university libraries. Also, the National Library has the obligation to collect and preserve materials published on the Internet to its web archive . The library also maintains the online public access catalog .

Any person who lives in Finland may register as a user of the National Library and borrow library material. The publications in the national collection, however, are not loaned outside the library. The library also is home to one of the most comprehensive collections of books published in the Russian Empire of any library in the world.

The National Library is located in Helsinki, close to the Senaatintori square. The oldest part of the library complex, designed by Carl Ludvig Engel, dates back to 1844. The newer extension Rotunda, designed by architect Gustaf Nyström, was completed in 1906.

See also
University of Helsinki
Helsinki Central Library

References

External links 

Agent Metadata Service of the National Library of Finland

Databases and public services 

 Finna - nationawide search engine at finna.fi 
 Digi - digitized newspapers and publications
 Finto - thesaurus and ontology service at finto.fi
 The National Library collections database
 Fennica - The Finnish National Bibliography
 Viola – the Finnish national discography 
 KANTO – National Agent Data  is a data repository and the national authority file for persons and corporate bodies in Finland.  Kanto is maintained by the Agent Metadata Service of the National Library. The id on the LOC source list for the Kanto database is finaf. All agents have a permanent identifier in the  http://urn.fi/URN:NBN:fi:au:finaf: namespace. Kanto replaces the earlier Finnish Corporate Names database. Read more in the Information package on Kanto - National Agent Data. Browse agents: KANTO in the Finto.fi service

1640 establishments in Sweden
Carl Ludvig Engel buildings
Culture in Helsinki
Government of Finland
Finland
University of Helsinki
Tourist attractions in Helsinki
Buildings and structures in Helsinki
Deposit libraries
Libraries in Finland
Library buildings completed in 1844
Libraries established in 1640